Vika and Linda, also known as Vika and Linda Bull, are an Australian vocal duo consisting of Vika Susan Bull  (born 1966) and her younger sister, Linda Rose Bull . They came to prominence after singing backing vocals in Joe Camilleri's band The Black Sorrows from 1988. They left that group early in 1994 to start their duo with a self-titled album appearing in June that year. The duo scored their first number 1 album in 2020, with their retrospective 'Akilotoa: Anthology (1994-2006).

History

1966–1982: Early years
Vika Susan Bull was born in 1966 in Doncaster, the older sister of Linda Rose Bull. Their mother, who was from Tonga, arrived in Australia in 1959 as a nursing student. Their father, whose parents were local orchardists, was from Melbourne. The family maintained close links to the local Tongan community, and the sisters were taught traditional singing and dancing. As children, they regularly performed with the family at dinner dances and the Tongan church they attended. After church they would have a Tongan feast, Vika recalled in 1995, "It didn't matter what the occasion was we would sing. We had harmonies around us ..., and now we mainly sing gospel .... It's a way of letting loose, which is what gospel music is all about". Vika received musical training. She had singing lessons, was taught the piano and how to read music. Vika and Linda both attended Camberwell Girls Grammar School. Vika left at the age of 17 to train as a legal secretary at Stotts College. Both worked at the Black Cat Cafe in their teens in Fitzroy.

While growing up, the sisters had separate ambitions: Vika wanted to be a professional singer; Linda wanted to be either a visual artist or a microbiologist. Vika started training as a secretary, while Linda entered university. They both enjoyed singing, with their mother, an early coach, noticing their sibling vocal harmony. Vika recalled, "Our mother taught us to sing in harmony. [She] said, 'Linda, you got the low voice. You take the low part.' I took the high part". Vika's early influences were Aretha Franklin, Etta James and Ruth Brown. Linda's influences were Linda Ronstadt, Aretha Franklin and Dolly Parton.

1983–1987: Blue Tomatoes, Fear of Flying, Sophisticated Boom Boom & The Honeymooners
By 1983 Vika had started a band, Blue Tomatoes, with one of the café's co-owners, Toni Edwards. They played cover versions of soul songs and a few originals. In 1984 Vika became a backing singer in a Melbourne band, Fear of Flying. After two years Vika joined Sophisticated Boom Boom. Other members of that group were Jenny Tubbs (now Barbato), Louise Taunt, Steve Purcell, Steve Dagg, Kerri Simpson, and Jeremy Rasmussen. Vika started working as a receptionist at Platinum Studios, a recording studio.

In 1987, Linda left university and joined Vika in Sophisticated Boom Boom. Vika also performed with John Justin and Thunderwings alongside Justin, Tony Featherstone, Paul Hines, Carl Manuel, Gordon Pitts, and Robert Woodrow. Later in 1987 the sisters formed their own band, The Honeymooners, with a line up of Jack Abeyratne, Thiery Fossmalle on bass guitar, and Steve Sedergreen. Vika met John Watson, drummer (ex-Australian Crawl, Kevin Borich Express) in James Reyne Band, and they married in 1997.

Vika's first recording opportunity occurred when Rebecca Barnard was using the Platinum Studios and one of her backing vocalists "lost her voice". Vika, the receptionist, was now a backing singer. Early in 1988 Vika released her debut solo single, "Livin' Hell", which was soon followed by a second single, "My House". Vika and Linda worked with Barnard and Simpson in The Sacred Hearts of Sweet Temptation.

1988–1993: Success with the Black Sorrows
By mid-1988, Vika and Linda had joined the Black Sorrows, a blues-rock group, which had formed in 1983 by Joe Camilleri (ex-Jo Jo Zep & The Falcons) on lead vocals and saxophone. The group's drummer, Peter Luscombe, recommended the sisters to Camilleri. They provided backing vocals on the Black Sorrows' fifth studio album, Hold On to Me (September 1988). The line-up was Vika and Linda, Camilleri, and Luscombe; with Wayne Burt on guitar; Jeff Burstin on guitar (both ex-Falcons); and Mick Girasole on bass guitar. The album peaked at No. 7 on the ARIA Albums Chart. Vika and Linda provided backing vocals on the band's hits on the related ARIA Singles Chart, "Hold On to Me", "Chained to the Wheel" and "The Crack-Up". For live gigs, Camilleri would give each their own "spots" displaying different voices: "Vika strong and soulful. Linda soft and gentle".

Their second album with The Black Sorrows was Harley & Rose (November 1990) and saw the duo provide lead vocals on some of the album tracks. It peaked at No. 3 and provided two top 30 singles, "Harley + Rose" and "Never Let Me Go". Better Times was released in September 1992 and peaked at No. 13. They followed with a compilation album, The Chosen Ones – Greatest Hits, in November 1993 which reached No. 4. The group toured in support of its release, Nicole Leedham of The Canberra Times noted that the band "has also been through the odd line-up change, with the latest incarnations offering the harmonies of Vika and Linda Bull, being the most successful".

Vika praised Camillleri saying that "He taught us that you have to take care of your own career, because no one else will do it for you. He taught us to watch every cent, to make sure your band is happy, and how to deal with the public". While members of The Black Sorrows, the duo provided vocals for other artists: Hunters and Collectors' What's a Few Men? (November 1987) and Ghost Nation (November 1989); Ross Wilson's Dark Side of the Man (July 1989); Archie Roach's Charcoal Lane (May 1990); John Farnham's Chain Reaction (September 1990); Seven Stories' Judges and Bagmen (1990); Deborah Conway's String of Pearls (October 1991) and Bitch Epic (1993). During the recording of Charcoal Lane, they met Paul Kelly, its producer, and a singer-songwriter in his own right.

1994–2001: Vika and Linda, Princess Tabu &  Two Wings
By February 1994 Vika and Linda had announced they would leave The Black Sorrows and were "branching into their solo careers". They began performing original works and country music covers at venues like the Cherry Tree and The Esplanade. They prepared material for their debut self-titled album. In March 1994 they performed at Canberra's National Food and Wine Frolic, where they presented their new material. Also that year the duo was invited to Tonga to sing at celebrations for the 75th birthday of King Tāufaʻāhau Tupou.

The duo's self-titled debut album was released in June 1994 on Mushroom Records and was produced by Kelly. A bonus disc, containing five gospel songs, was included with the special edition of the album. Kelly also provided guitars and backing vocals. Other session musicians were Burstin on guitars; Luscombe on drums; Stephen Hadley on bass guitar; and Jex Saarelaht on keyboards. All tracks on the standard edition were originals. Kelly had offered twelve tracks (they recorded five) including "Ninety Nine Years", which had been co-written with Vika and Linda. Three other tracks were written specifically for the duo, "When Will You Fall For Me" by Mark Seymour (of Hunters & Collectors), "House of Love" by Wayne Burt, and "These Hands That Hold Me" by Eris O'Brien. "When Will You Fall For Me" and "House of Love" were both featured as backing music on the soap opera, Home and Away. Other tracks were written by Camilleri and Stephen Cummings. Linda told The Canberra Times Naomi Mapstone "it was amazing how friendly and helpful these people were, they could just as easily have said no because they're so busy". Another The Canberra Times review described their music as "a mix of blues, reggae, rock and country-flavoured offerings". The album peaked at No. 7 on the ARIA Albums Chart, and was certified platinum. It was also nominated for an ARIA Music Award in 1995 for 'Breakthrough Artist – Album'. In New Zealand it reached No. 16 on New Zealand Albums Chart in April 1995. Vika and Linda had four singles, "When Will You Fall For Me" (May 1994), "House of Love" (August 1994), "Hard Love" (December 1994) and "We've Started a Fire" (1995). None made the top 50 in Australia although "House of Love" reached No. 32 in New Zealand.
        
In November 1994 they supported Billy Joel on his Australian tour for three weeks. During the next year, they toured Europe with a backing band, which included Michael Barker on percussion. While in the UK they spent a week at Peter Gabriel's studio recording. At the Mouth of the River was a compilation of tracks, which was released on the Real World label. One of the tracks, " I Know Where to Go to Feel Good", was recorded with Iggy Pop. Also in the UK they worked at the World of Recording Week, a WOMAD (World Of Music Art and Dance) event.

Their second studio album, Princess Tabu, was released in August 1996, peaking at No. 30 in Australia. It was co-produced by Vika and Linda with Jeremy Allom and Diesel. It has tracks co-written by the sisters with various collaborators including Barker, Diesel, Kelly, and Tim Finn. Additional musicians used were Barker, Diesel, Stuart Fraser, Bruce Haynes and Stuart Speed. It was recorded in Melbourne, Sydney and in Tonga – where they "paid their respects to the nation's monarch King Taufa'ahu  Tupou". Australian musicologist, Ian McFarlane, felt the album was a "purer reflection of the cultural strains and rich diversity of their heritage". An extended version of Princess Tabu was issued in the following year, which included a bonus live disc – with acoustic versions of earlier material recorded at the Continental Hotel, Prahran.

During the next few years the duo toured and prepared material for a third studio album, Two Wings. In the interim Linda and percussionist Justin Stanford had their first child, as did Vika and Watson. The sisters released their third studio album, Two Wings, in August 1999, a collection of spiritual songs, which McFarlane described as an "inspired song selection ranging from blues and gospel to reggae and soul". It was co-produced by Renée Geyer with Kelly and includes tracks written by Kelly, Roach, Bob Marley and Tim Rogers. The album peaked at No. 34 on the ARIA Albums Chart, and was nominated for 'Best Adult Contemporary Album' at the ARIA Music Awards of 2000.

In November 2000 they released a live album, Live and Acoustic, recorded at the Continental Hotel. It was co-produced by the sisters with Burstin. Australian music journalist, Ed Nimmervoll, declared it to be his Album of the Week, noting that it "brings us back to the start, pure Vika and Linda, just singing together, as they always have and always will, applying all the experience and confidence they've accumulated, more gospel than you might expect". In the following year, Vika and Linda were released by the merged Festival Mushroom Records Vika and Linda now promoted and distributed their new music, although Mushroom still held the rights to their back catalogue.

2002–2017: Love is Mighty Close, Between Two Shores
Vika and Linda's fourth studio album, Love is Mighty Close, was released independently in July 2002 using a country-blues style. Tracks were written by Cummings, Kelly, Cyndi Boste, Dan Brodie, Rob Snarski and Chris Wilson. The album failed to chart but it was nominated for Best Adult Contemporary Album at the ARIA Music Awards of 2002. Following its release, the sisters focussed on their gospel roots. The backing band's line-up changed, with Burstin replaced on guitar by Dion Hirini. During a three month residency at the Cornish Arms, Vika and Linda played and recorded gospel tunes; which resulted in a second live album, Tell the Angels, in May 2004.

After the release of Tell the Angels, the sisters took a break from performing as a duo, during which Linda and Stanford had their second child, with Linda spending more time with parenting responsibilities. In 2005, the sisters opened a children's wear shop in North Fitzroy, Hoochie Coochie. From November that year they presented six episodes of a TV series, Pacific Stories, on ABC2. Episode 5, "Fit for a King", broadcast on 15 December detailed the 1994 celebrations where the duo sang for the king of Tonga.

In September 2006, Liberation Blue released Vika and Linda's fifth studio album, Between Two Shores. In December of that year, MGM Distribution re-issued four of their early albums: Vika and Linda, Princess Tabu, Two Wings and Live & Acoustic.

During the 2010s, the sisters frequently provided backing vocals for the guest artist on the TV show RocKwiz.

On 1 October 2016, Vika and Linda sang the national anthem at the 2016 AFL Grand Final. Cameron Adams from news.com.au said, "Their majestic harmonies supplied even more goosebumps on a day already charged with emotion. Anyone who has to sing the national anthem at a major sporting event in the future needs to YouTube this as research".

===2018–2020: Akilotoa and Sunday (The Gospel According to Iso)===
In July 2018, Vika indicated that the duo are in the process of preparing songs for a new Vika & Linda album (the first album of new material since 2002), that will include songwriting contributions from Paul Kelly, Kasey Chambers, Dan Kelly, and Linda Bull (where Linda is collaborating with Paul Kelly on a few tracks). Vika has indicated that the album will be recorded in February 2019, with an impending release sometime in 2019.

In November 2019, the duo were inducted into the Music Victoria Hall of Fame. 

During the COVID-19 pandemic, the duo live streamed a series of singing sessions via Facebook, where they sang songs for their fans.

In May 2020, the duo confirmed the release of their first greatest hits album, titled 'Akilotoa which was released on 12 June 2020 and debuted at number 1 on the ARIA Charts, becoming their first chart topper. In June 2020, the duo confirmed they would record their sixth studio album in July 2020.

On 24 July 2020, the duo announced the release of Sunday (The Gospel According to Iso), a gospel album recorded on Sundays during the COVID-19 pandemic. The album was released in September 2020 and peaked at number 2 on the ARIA Charts.

2021–present: The Wait and Gee Whiz, It's Christmas!
The duo released their first album of original material in 19 years, The Wait, on 17 September 2021. The Wait includes tracks written by Bernard Fanning, Don Walker, Paul Kelly, Kasey Chambers, Augie March's Glenn Richards and the Living End's Chris Cheney, and debuted at number two on the ARIA Albums Chart.

In October 2022, the duo announced their eighth studio album, titled Gee Whiz, It's Christmas!.

Discography

Studio albumsVika and Linda (1994)Princess Tabu (1996)Two Wings (1999)Love is Mighty Close (2002)Between Two Shores (2006)Sunday (The Gospel According to Iso) (2020)The Wait (2021)
 Gee Whiz, It's Christmas! (2022)

Awards and nominations
Vika and Linda were awarded the Medal of the Order of Australia in the 2022 Queen's Birthday Honours.

AIR Awards
The Australian Independent Record Awards (known colloquially as the AIR Awards) is an annual awards night to recognise, promote and celebrate the success of Australia's Independent Music sector.

! 
|-
| 2021
| Sunday (The Gospel According to Iso)| Best Independent Blues and Roots Album or EP
| 
| 
|}

ARIA Music Awards
The ARIA Music Awards is an annual awards ceremony that recognises excellence, innovation, and achievement across all genres of Australian music. Vika and Linda have been nominated for five awards.

|-
| scope="row" rowspan="2"| 1995
| Vika and Linda| ARIA Award for Breakthrough Artist – Album
| 
|-
| "When Will You Fall for Me?"
| ARIA Award for Breakthrough Artist – Single
| 
|-
| 1997
| Princess Tabu| ARIA Award for Best Adult Contemporary Album
| 
|-
| 2000
| Two Wings| ARIA Award for Best Adult Contemporary Album
| 
|-
| 2002
| Love is Mighty Close| ARIA Award for Best Adult Contemporary Album
| 
|-
| 2022
| The Wait| ARIA Award for Best Adult Contemporary Album
| 
|-

Australian Women in Music Awards
The Australian Women in Music Awards is an annual event that celebrates outstanding women in the Australian Music Industry who have made significant and lasting contributions in their chosen field. They commenced in 2018.

|-
| 2019
| Vika and Linda
| Lifetime Achievement Award
| 

Music Victoria Awards
The Music Victoria Awards are an annual awards night celebrating Victorian music. They commenced in 2005.

|-
| 2019 || Vika and Linda|| Hall of Fame || 
|-

Rolling Stone Australia Awards
The Rolling Stone Australia Awards are awarded annually in January or February by the Australian edition of Rolling Stone'' magazine for outstanding contributions to popular culture in the previous year.

! 
|-
| 2022
| Vika and Linda
| Rolling Stone Readers' Choice Award
| 
|

 References General  Note: Archived [on-line] copy has limited functionality.Specific'''

External links
Linda & Vika Bull's Website
"Vika and Linda: Love Is Mighty Close" archived from the original at Planet Tonga on 12 April 2003. Retrieved on 16 April 2014.

Australian women singers
Living people
Sibling musical duos
Australian people of Tongan descent
Year of birth missing (living people)
Recipients of the Medal of the Order of Australia